High Knob is a mountain peak in Virginia.

High Knob may also refer to:

High Knob (New York), a mountain in Schoharie County
High Knob (Blue Ridge, Virginia), a peak of the Blue Ridge Mountains
High Knob (West Virginia), a mountain summit
High Knob, Kentucky, a community; see List of Kentucky supplemental roads and rural secondary highways (500–599)#Kentucky Route 577